Lobeco (pronounced luh-BEE-co) is an unincorporated community and census-designated place (CDP) located in Beaufort County, South Carolina, United States. Per the 2020 census, the population was 292.

Situated about 10 miles (12 km) north of Beaufort, it is a predominantly agricultural area that has retained its rural character. A small community area consisting of a library, post office, and produce market serve as an anchor for the surrounding community. It is served by U.S. Highway 21. Nearby communities include Dale, Seabrook, and Sheldon. Its zipcode is: 29931.

The community name comes from an acronym of Long, Bellamy, and Company.

Lobeco has a public library, a branch of the Beaufort County Library.

Demographics

2020 census

Note: the US Census treats Hispanic/Latino as an ethnic category. This table excludes Latinos from the racial categories and assigns them to a separate category. Hispanics/Latinos can be of any race.

Notes

Unincorporated communities in Beaufort County, South Carolina
Hilton Head Island–Beaufort micropolitan area
Unincorporated communities in South Carolina
Census-designated places in Beaufort County, South Carolina
Census-designated places in South Carolina